Lethyna nexilis is a species of tephritid or fruit flies in the genus Lethyna of the family Tephritidae.

Distribution
Uganda.

References

Tephritinae
Insects described in 1957
Diptera of Africa